Temnora probata is a moth of the  family Sphingidae. It is known from Tanzania.

The wingspan is 39–43 mm. It is very similar to Temnora burdoni, but the forewing apex and tornus and hindwing tornus are more pronounced and the middle of the forewing outer margin is very convex.

References

Temnora
Moths described in 2004